VZ Arietis is single, white-hued star in the northern zodiac constellation of Aries. Varying between magnitudes 5.82 and 5.89, the star can be seen with the naked eye in dark, unpolluted areas. It is moving further away with a heliocentric radial velocity of +14 km/s. The star was formerly known as 16 Trianguli, but as the star is no longer in the constellation Triangulum, this designation has fallen out of use.

This is a chemically peculiar star of type CP2 (Ap star), showing an anomalous abundance of silicon in its spectrum. It has a stellar classification of A0 V, which indicates this is an A-type main-sequence star that currently fusing hydrogen into helium in its core. This is an Alpha2 Canum Venaticorum variable with 2.7 times the mass of the Sun and about 3.1 times the Sun's radius. It is radiating 79 times the Sun's luminosity from its photosphere at an effective temperature of 10,304 K.

References

A-type main-sequence stars
Alpha2 Canum Venaticorum variables
Ap stars
Aries (constellation)
Durchmusterung objects
Trianguli, 16
017471
013121
0830
Arietis, VZ